Dreamboat Records is a British independent record label based in Bristol, England.

History
The label was founded in 2005, and released records on a small scale for a group of local artists. In 2009 it expanded to include releases of independent film soundtracks. In 2009, they became the label for This Is The Kit and, in 2010, the UK label for Bear in Heaven.

Artists
 The Rollercoaster Project
 Robin Allender
 This Is The Kit
 Bear In Heaven
 Whalebone Polly
 The Gala Band
 The Quebe Sisters

Film soundtracks
 How To Be composed by Joe Hastings
 Morris: A Life with Bells On composed by Richard Lumsden
 She, A Chinese composed by John Parish

Compilations
 Adam and Joe Song Wars Volume 2 from The Adam and Joe Show on BBC Radio 6 Music

Discography

British independent record labels
British record labels